Rififi in Amsterdam is a 1966 Italian-Spanish crime-adventure film directed by Sergio Grieco and starring Roger Browne.

Plot
An ex-con and thief must elude the authorities and the criminal underworld as he attempts to locate a stash of jewelry stolen by the Nazis.

Cast
Roger Browne  as  Rex Morrison 
Evelyn Stewart as Ethel Fischer, Max Fischer's wife 
Aida Power as Oriana
Umberto Raho as Vladek
Franco Ressel as professor Max Fischer
Tullio Altamura as Manolo 
Erika Blanc
Franco Lantieri 	
Tito García

References

External links

Italian crime films
Spanish crime films
1960s crime films
Films directed by Sergio Grieco
Films scored by Piero Umiliani
1960s Italian-language films
1960s Italian films
1960s Spanish films